The Copihue de Oro is an award created by the Chilean newspaper La Cuarta to recognize figures from the world of entertainment and show business in that country. Its symbol is the flower of the species Lapageria rosea.

The 2011 Copihue de Oro was given in 23 categories, distributed among popular music, modeling, radio, and television in Chile. Over time, the number of categories has varied, reaching a high of 24 in 2013, falling to 18 in 2015.

Categories

Music

Career awards

 2005 – Palmenia Pizarro
 2006 – Lucho Gatica
 2007 – Coco Legrand
 2008 – Antonio Vodanovic
 2009 – Mario Kreutzberger
 2010 – 
 2011 – Jorge Pedreros
 2012 – 
 2013 – Zalo Reyes
 2014 – Peter Rock
 2015 – Tachuela Chico
 2016 – Cecilia
 2017 – Jorge González
 2018 – Valnetín Trujillo
 2019 – 
 2021 – Iván Arenas

Hosts

Records

Most awards won
 9: Luis Jara: Established Singer (2005, 2006), Best Male Singer (2007), Best Romantic Singer (2010, 2012, 2013), and Best Host (2013, 2014, 2015)
 7: Tonka Tomicic: Best Host (2006, 2007, 2008, 2009, 2013, 2016, 2017)
 7: Buenos Días a Todos: Best Morning Program (2005, 2006, 2007, 2008, 2009, 2010, 2011)

Most awards won in different categories
 Luis Jara: Established Singer (2005, 2006), Best Male Singer (2007), Best Romantic Singer (2010, 2012, 2013), and Best Host (2013, 2014, 2015)

Youngest winner
 Belén Soto: Best Actress (2007), age 10

Most awards won by a male artist
 9: Luis Jara: Established Singer (2005, 2006), Best Male Singer (2007), Best Romantic Singer (2010, 2012, 2013), and Best Host (2013, 2014, 2015)
 6: Felipe Camiroaga: Best Host (2006, 2007, 2008, 2009, 2010, 2011 – posthumous)
 6: : Best Radio Broadcaster (2005, 2006, 2007, 2009, 2010, 2011)

Most awards won by a female artist
 7: Tonka Tomicic: Best Host (2006, 2007, 2008, 2009, 2013, 2016, 2017)

Most awards won by a group
 6: Los Jaivas: Best Folk Music Group (2008, 2009, 2010, 2011, 2012, 2013)

Controversies
 In 2009, Rafael Araneda was involved in a confusing incident when it was discovered that one of his employees, Rogelio Rojas, had purchased a significant number of votes in the election for Best Host. When the story broke, Araneda publicly apologized and returned the award.
 On occasion, some winners have been booed during the presentation of the Copihue de Oro. Such was the case with Felipe Camiroaga, awarded as Best Host in 2010, whom the public blamed for the separation of Katherine Salosny from Buenos Días a Todos. A similar situation occurred with the Best Host of 2016, Luis Jara, who was booed after the departure of journalist Álvaro Sanhueza from the morning show Mucho gusto.

References

External links
 

2005 establishments in Chile
Awards established in 2005
Chilean film awards
Latin music awards